The Convention of Christian Democrats is a political party in the Democratic Republic of the Congo. The party won 10 out of 500 seats in the 2006 parliamentary elections. In the 19 January 2007 Senate elections, the party won 3 out of 108 seats.

References

Christian democratic parties in Africa
Political parties in the Democratic Republic of the Congo